The Vienna Internet Exchange (VIX) is an Internet Exchange Point (IXP) situated in Vienna, Austria. It was established in 1996. VIX is a non-profit, neutral, and independent peering network.

VIX is the largest Internet Exchange Point in Austria, when measured by number of members and traffic.

History
The Vienna Internet Exchangepoint hosted the 11th Euro-IX Forum, held 12–13 November 2007.

See also
 List of Internet exchange points

References

External links
 Official website
 Traffic statistics

Internet exchange points in Austria
Internet in Austria